Panhandle is an unincorporated community in Wayne Township, Jefferson County, Ohio, United States.

The Panhandle Post Office was established on August 16, 1911, and discontinued on October 15, 1923. Mail service is now handled through the  Unionport branch.

References

Unincorporated communities in Jefferson County, Ohio